Henri Courtine (11 May 1930 – 20 February 2021) was a French judoka.

Career
He studied with Mikinosuke Kawaishi, and his assistant, Shozo Awazu. He received a bronze medal at the 1956 World Judo Championships in Tokyo, shared with Anton Geesink, after losing the semi final to winner Shokichi Natsui. He was three times individual European champion (1952, 1958 and 1959), and four times with the French team (1952, 1954, 1955 and 1956). He served as sports director of the International Judo Federation (IJF) from 1979 to 1987.

Henri Courtine was honored with the title jūdan (10th dan) in 2007, as the first ever French judoka.
This title however is not officially recognized by the Kodokan.

Courtine died on 20 February 2021, aged 90.

References

External links
 

1930 births
2021 deaths
French male judoka
Sportspeople from Paris
Place of death missing
20th-century French people